Simonsen is a surname. Notable people with the surname include:

Allan Simonsen (born 1952), Danish football player
Allan Simonsen (racing driver) (1978–2013), Danish racing driver
Bengt Simonsen (racewalker) (born 1958), Swedish racewalker
Fanny Simonsen (c. 1835–1896), French-born soprano in Australia
Iluska Pereira da Cunha Simonsen (1941–2017), Brazilian chess master
Jan Simonsen (born 1953), Norwegian politician 
John Ditlev-Simonsen (1898–1967), Norwegian sailor
Karen Simonsen, Canadian judge
Lasse Simonsen (born 1953), Norwegian law professor
Mário Henrique Simonsen (1935–1997), Brazilian economist, professor, banker, and finance minister
Martin Simonsen (c. 1829–1899), Danish-born violinist and impresario in Australia 
Mikael Simonsen (1882–1950), Danish rower
Olaf Ditlev-Simonsen (1897–1978), Norwegian sailor
Per Ditlev-Simonsen (born June 12, 1932), Norwegian politician
Peter Simonsen (born 1959), New Zealand football player 
Redmond A. Simonsen (1942–2005), American graphic artist
Renée Simonsen (born 1965), Danish  model 
Rudolph Simonsen (1889–1947), Danish composer
Steve Simonsen (born 1979), English football goalkeeper 
Thorkild Simonsen (1926–2022), Danish politician
Wallace Cochrane Simonsen (1884–1955), Brazilian banker

See also 
 Simmonds
 Symonds
 Symons
 Simons
 Simonson
 Simonsson

Danish-language surnames
Norwegian-language surnames
Patronymic surnames
Surnames from given names